Belaúnde is a surname, and may refer to;

Alberto Bustamante Belaunde (1950–2008) - Peruvian politician
Fernando Belaúnde Terry (1912–2002) - 42nd & 43rd President of Peru
José Antonio García Belaúnde (b. 1948) - Peruvian diplomat
Víctor Andrés Belaúnde (1883–1966) - Peruvian diplomat
Víctor Andrés García Belaúnde (b. 1949) - Peruvian politician

Basque-language surnames
Surnames of Peruvian origin